The 2021–22 Golden State Warriors season was the 76th season of the franchise in the National Basketball Association (NBA), its 60th in the San Francisco Bay Area, and its third season at the Chase Center. After failing to make the playoffs the previous two seasons, the Warriors beat the Boston Celtics 4–2 in the Finals. It was the Warriors' fourth championship in eight years, and seventh overall. With the win, many analysts claimed the Warriors as one of the greatest dynasties in NBA history.

On December 14, Stephen Curry hit five three-pointers against the New York Knicks to reach 2,977, which surpassed Ray Allen's career total of 2,973 for most three-pointers made in NBA history in the regular season. Earlier in the season against the Chicago Bulls, Curry hit nine three-pointers to reach 3,366 which broke Allen's record of 3,358 for most three-pointers made in NBA history, regular season, and postseason combined. Curry also became the first player in NBA history to surpass 500 three-pointers in the play-offs, finishing with 561.

On January 9, Klay Thompson made his season debut against the Cleveland Cavaliers after missing the 2019–20 season with a left ACL tear, and the 2020–21 season with a right Achilles tendon tear. He recorded 17 points and 3 rebounds in a 96–82 win.

Stephen Curry, Andrew Wiggins, and Draymond Green were named to the 2022 NBA All-Star Game; however, Green was injured and did not play in the game. On February 20, Team LeBron defeated Team Durant in the All-Star Game and Curry, playing for Team LeBron, was named the All-Star Game MVP. This is the fifth time that a Warriors player has won the award. He scored 50 points, and set numerous All-Star Game records, including most three-pointers made (16), and most all-time three-pointers made in the All-Star Game (47).

The Warriors had a  record in February, then went 7–16 in an injury-plagued stretch of 23 games, and then won the final 5 games of the season. They clinched a playoff berth for the first time since 2018–19 season after a 111–107 win over the Utah Jazz on April 2. In the first round of the playoffs, the Warriors defeated the Denver Nuggets in five games. In the second round, the Warriors upset the second-seed Memphis Grizzlies in six games. They went on to defeat the Dallas Mavericks in five games, winning the Western Conference for the seventh time in their history, and the sixth time in the last eight years. The last team to win six championships in eight years was the 1990–98 Chicago Bulls in the Eastern Conference. The Warriors under Steve Kerr have never lost a Western Conference playoff series, going 18–0 during this span, tied with the 1959–67 Boston Celtics for the longest playoff winning streak in NBA history against their conference opponents. Golden State met the Boston Celtics in the NBA Finals in a rematch of the 1964 Finals, in which the Celtics defeated the then–San Francisco Warriors in five games. The Warriors defeated the Celtics four games to two to win their fourth championship in eight years, seventh overall, and first since 2018. After the series, many analysts claimed that the Warriors were one of the greatest dynasties in NBA history. During the championship run, the Warriors won at least one road game in all four playoff series, thus extending their NBA record for consecutives playoff series with at least one road win at 27, a record that is "beyond compare" in NBA history.

Draft
 

The Warriors had two first-round picks entering the draft. The seventh pick was given from the Timberwolves following the Andrew Wiggins trade from the 2019–20 season.

Standings

Division

Conference 

Notes
 z – Clinched home court advantage for the entire playoffs
 c – Clinched home court advantage for the conference playoffs
 y – Clinched division title
 x – Clinched playoff spot
 o – Eliminated from playoff contention
 * – Division leader
 pi – Play In

Roster

Game log

Preseason

|- style="background:#cfc;"
| 1
| October 4
| @ Portland
| 
| Jordan Poole (30)
| Andre Iguodala (6)
| Nemanja Bjelica (6)
| Moda Center13,936
| 1–0
|- style="background:#cfc;"
| 2
| October 6
| Denver
| 
| Jordan Poole (17)
| Otto Porter (9)
| Juan Toscano-Anderson (5)
| Chase Center16,923
| 2–0
|- style="background:#cfc;"
| 3
| October 8
| L.A. Lakers
| 
| Stephen Curry (30)
| Galloway, Green, Porter (6)
| Draymond Green (7)
| Chase Center18,064
| 3–0
|- style="background:#cfc;"
| 4
| October 12
| @ L.A. Lakers
| 
| Jordan Poole (18)
| Lee, Wiggins (9)
| Andre Iguodala (5)
| Staples Center11,526
| 4–0
|- style="background:#cfc;"
| 5
| October 15
| Portland
| 
| Stephen Curry (41)
| Stephen Curry (9)
| Draymond Green (7)
| Chase Center18,064
| 5–0

Regular season

|- style="background:#cfc;"
| 1
| October 19
| @ L.A. Lakers
| 
| Stephen Curry (21)
| Nemanja Bjelica (11)
| Stephen Curry (10)
| Staples Center18,997
| 1–0
|- style="background:#cfc;"
| 2
| October 21
| L.A. Clippers
| 
| Stephen Curry (45)
| Stephen Curry (10)
| Draymond Green (7)
| Chase Center18,064
| 2–0
|- style="background:#cfc;"
| 3
| October 24
| @ Sacramento
| 
| Stephen Curry (27)
| Otto Porter (9)
| Stephen Curry (10)
| Golden 1 Center13,876
| 3–0
|- style="background:#cfc;"
| 4
| October 26
| @ Oklahoma City
| 
| Stephen Curry (23)
| Draymond Green (9)
| Draymond Green (8)
| Paycom Center15,717
| 4–0
|- style="background:#fcc;"
| 5
| October 28
| Memphis
| 
| Stephen Curry (36)
| Draymond Green (12)
| Stephen Curry (8)
| Chase Center18,064
| 4–1
|- style="background:#cfc;"
| 6
| October 30
| Oklahoma City
| 
| Stephen Curry (20)
| Draymond Green (11)
| Draymond Green (8)
| Chase Center18,064
| 5–1

|- style="background:#cfc;"
| 7
| November 3
| Charlotte
| 
| Jordan Poole (31)
| Draymond Green (10)
| Stephen Curry (9)
| Chase Center18,064
| 6–1
|- style="background:#cfc;"
| 8
| November 5
| New Orleans
| 
| Jordan Poole (26)
| Draymond Green (8)
| Andre Iguodala (10)
| Chase Center18,064
| 7–1
|- style="background:#cfc;"
| 9
| November 7
| Houston
| 
| Jordan Poole (25)
| Otto Porter (9)
| Draymond Green (9)
| Chase Center18,064
| 8–1
|- style="background:#cfc;"
| 10
| November 8
| Atlanta
| 
| Stephen Curry (50)
| Curry, Green (7)
| Stephen Curry (10)
| Chase Center18,064
| 9–1
|- style="background:#cfc;"
| 11
| November 10
| Minnesota
| 
| Andrew Wiggins (35)
| Kevon Looney (17)
| Andre Iguodala (8)
| Chase Center18,064
| 10–1
|- style="background:#cfc;"
| 12
| November 12
| Chicago
| 
| Stephen Curry (40)
| Kevon Looney (10)
| Draymond Green (7)
| Chase Center18,064
| 11–1
|- style="background:#fcc;"
| 13
| November 14
| @ Charlotte
| 
| Andrew Wiggins (28)
| Kevon Looney (8)
| Stephen Curry (10)
| Spectrum Center19,559
| 11–2
|- style="background:#cfc;"
| 14
| November 16
| @ Brooklyn
| 
| Stephen Curry (37)
| Stephen Curry (7)
| Draymond Green (8)
| Barclays Center17,732
| 12–2
|- style="background:#cfc;"
| 15
| November 18
| @ Cleveland
| 
| Stephen Curry (40)
| Lee, Payton II (6)
| Draymond Green (14)
| Rocket Mortgage FieldHouse19,432
| 13–2
|- style="background:#cfc;"
| 16
| November 19
| @ Detroit
| 
| Jordan Poole (32)
| Kevon Looney (12)
| Juan Toscano-Anderson (9)
| Little Caesars Arena20,088
| 14–2
|- style="background:#cfc;"
| 17
| November 21
| Toronto
| 
| Jordan Poole (33)
| Draymond Green (14)
| Curry, Green (8)
| Chase Center18,064
| 15–2
|- style="background:#cfc;"
| 18
| November 24
| Philadelphia
| 
| Stephen Curry (25)
| Draymond Green (9)
| Stephen Curry (10)
| Chase Center18,064
| 16–2
|- style="background:#cfc;"
| 19
| November 26
| Portland
| 
| Stephen Curry (32)
| Green, Toscano-Anderson (8)
| Draymond Green (12)
| Chase Center18,064
| 17–2
|- style="background:#cfc;"
| 20
| November 28
| @ L.A. Clippers
| 
| Stephen Curry (33)
| Otto Porter (10)
| Draymond Green (7)
| Staples Center19,068
| 18–2
|- style="background:#fcc;"
| 21
| November 30
| @ Phoenix
| 
| Jordan Poole (28)
| Draymond Green (11)
| Draymond Green (5)
| Footprint Center17,071
| 18–3

|- style="background:#cfc;"
| 22
| December 3
| Phoenix
| 
| Stephen Curry (23)
| Draymond Green (9)
| Draymond Green (9)
| Chase Center18,064
| 19–3
|- style="background:#fcc;"
| 23
| December 4
| San Antonio
| 
| Stephen Curry (27)
| Curry, Green (8)
| Draymond Green (9)
| Chase Center18,064
| 19–4
|- style="background:#cfc;"
| 24
| December 6
| Orlando
| 
| Stephen Curry (31)
| Green, Poole (7)
| Stephen Curry (8)
| Chase Center18,064
| 20–4
|- style="background:#cfc;"
| 25
| December 8
| Portland
| 
| Stephen Curry (22)
| Draymond Green (10)
| Draymond Green (8)
| Chase Center18,064
| 21–4
|- style="background:#fcc;"
| 26
| December 11
| @ Philadelphia
| 
| Jordan Poole (23)
| Stephen Curry (9)
| Stephen Curry (5)
| Wells Fargo Center21,016
| 21–5
|- style="background:#cfc;"
| 27
| December 13
| @ Indiana
| 
| Stephen Curry (26)
| Draymond Green (9)
| Stephen Curry (6)
| Bankers Life Fieldhouse17,018
| 22–5
|- style="background:#cfc;"
| 28
| December 14
| @ New York
| 
| Stephen Curry (22)
| Draymond Green (11)
| Draymond Green (7)
| Madison Square Garden19,812
| 23–5
|- style="background:#cfc;"
| 29
| December 17
| @ Boston
| 
| Stephen Curry (30)
| Kevon Looney (10)
| Draymond Green (8)
| TD Garden19,156
| 24–5
|- style="background:#fcc;"
| 30
| December 18
| @ Toronto
| 
| Jonathan Kuminga (26)
| Juan Toscano-Anderson (10)
| Chris Chiozza (7)
| Scotiabank Arena7,988
| 24–6
|- style="background:#cfc;"
| 31
| December 20
| Sacramento
| 
| Stephen Curry (30)
| Draymond Green (11)
| Draymond Green (10)
| Chase Center18,064
| 25–6
|- style="background:#cfc;"
| 32
| December 23
| Memphis
| 
| Stephen Curry (46)
| Otto Porter (9)
| Draymond Green (9)
| Chase Center18,064
| 26–6
|- style="background:#cfc;"
| 33
| December 25
| @ Phoenix
| 
| Stephen Curry (33)
| Kevon Looney (10)
| Draymond Green (10)
| Footprint Center17,071
| 27–6
|- style="background:#fcc;"
| 34
| December 28
| Denver
| 
| Stephen Curry (23)
| Bjelica, Wiggins (8)
| Curry, Iguodala (4)
| Chase Center18,064
| 27–7
|- style="background:#ccc;"
| –
| December 30
| @ Denver
| colspan="6" | Postponed (COVID-19) (Makeup date: March 7)

|- style="background:#cfc;"
| 35
| January 1
| @ Utah
| 
| Stephen Curry (28)
| Iguodala, Looney, Porter (7)
| Stephen Curry (9)
| Vivint Arena18,306
| 28–7
|- style="background:#cfc;"
| 36
| January 3
| Miami
| 
| Jordan Poole (32)
| Draymond Green (8)
| Draymond Green (13)
| Chase Center18,064
| 29–7
|- style="background:#fcc;"
| 37
| January 5
| @ Dallas
| 
| Andrew Wiggins (17)
| Gary Payton II (11)
| Stephen Curry (5)
| American Airlines Center20,441
| 29–8
|- style="background:#fcc;"
| 38
| January 6
| @ New Orleans
| 
| Andrew Wiggins (21)
| Kevon Looney (9)
| Andre Iguodala (7)
| Smoothie King Center15,986
| 29–9
|- style="background:#cfc;"
| 39
| January 9
| Cleveland
| 
| Stephen Curry (28)
| Kevon Looney (18)
| Curry, Iguodala (5)
| Chase Center18,064
| 30–9
|- style="background:#fcc;"
| 40
| January 11
| @ Memphis
| 
| Stephen Curry (27)
| Stephen Curry (10)
| Stephen Curry (10)
| FedExForum17,794
| 30–10
|- style="background:#fcc;"
| 41
| January 13
| @ Milwaukee
| 
| Andrew Wiggins (16)
| Stephen Curry (8)
| Stephen Curry (5)
| Fiserv Forum17,848
| 30–11
|- style="background:#cfc;"
| 42
| January 14
| @ Chicago
| 
| Jonathan Kuminga (25)
| Kevon Looney (12)
| Nemanja Bjelica (7)
| United Center21,174
| 31–11
|- style="background:#fcc;"
| 43
| January 16
| @ Minnesota
| 
| Jordan Poole (20)
| Kevon Looney (12)
| Porter, Wiggins (4)
| Target Center17,136
| 31–12
|- style="background:#cfc;"
| 44
| January 18
| Detroit
| 
| Klay Thompson (21)
| Kuminga, Looney (10)
| Stephen Curry (8)
| Chase Center18,064
| 32–12
|- style="background:#fcc;"
| 45
| January 20
| Indiana
| 
| Stephen Curry (39)
| Kevon Looney (15)
| Stephen Curry (8)
| Chase Center18,064
| 32–13
|- style="background:#cfc;"
| 46
| January 21
| Houston
| 
| Stephen Curry (22)
| Kevon Looney (12)
| Stephen Curry (12)
| Chase Center18,064
| 33–13
|- style="background:#cfc;"
| 47
| January 23
| Utah
| 
| Jordan Poole (20)
| Otto Porter (8)
| Stephen Curry (6)
| Chase Center18,064
| 34–13
|- style="background:#cfc;"
| 48
| January 25
| Dallas
| 
| Jonathan Kuminga (22)
| Nemanja Bjelica (10)
| Stephen Curry (7)
| Chase Center18,064
| 35–13
|- style="background:#cfc;"
| 49
| January 27
| Minnesota
| 
| Stephen Curry (29)
| Curry, Payton II (5)
| Bjelica, Curry (6)
| Chase Center18,064
| 36–13
|- style="background:#cfc;"
| 50
| January 29
| Brooklyn
| 
| Andrew Wiggins (24)
| Kevon Looney (15)
| Stephen Curry (8)
| Chase Center18,064
| 37–13
|- style="background:#cfc;"
| 51
| January 31
| @ Houston
| 
| Stephen Curry (40)
| Kevon Looney (14)
| Stephen Curry (9)
| Toyota Center16,146
| 38–13

|- style="background:#cfc;"
| 52
| February 1
| @ San Antonio
| 
| Jordan Poole (31)
| Kevon Looney (12)
| Juan Toscano-Anderson (7)
| AT&T Center17,070
| 39–13
|- style="background:#cfc;"
| 53
| February 3
| Sacramento
| 
| Klay Thompson (23)
| Kuminga, Looney (7)
| Curry, Thompson (7)
| Chase Center18,064
| 40–13
|- style="background:#cfc;"
| 54
| February 7
| @ Oklahoma City
| 
| Klay Thompson (21)
| Stephen Curry (9)
| Stephen Curry (10)
| Paycom Center17,009
| 41–13
|- style="background:#fcc;"
| 55
| February 9
| @ Utah
| 
| Jordan Poole (18)
| Curry, Looney (7)
| Andrew Wiggins (4)
| Vivint Arena18,306
| 41–14
|- style="background:#fcc;"
| 56
| February 10
| New York
| 
| Stephen Curry (35)
| Thompson, Wiggins (7)
| Stephen Curry (10)
| Chase Center18,064
| 41–15
|- style="background:#cfc;"
| 57
| February 12
| L.A. Lakers
| 
| Klay Thompson (33)
| Kevon Looney (12)
| Stephen Curry (8)
| Chase Center18,064
| 42–15
|- style="background:#fcc;"
| 58
| February 14
| @ L.A. Clippers
| 
| Stephen Curry (33)
| Otto Porter (8)
| Kevon Looney (5)
| Crypto.com Arena19,068
| 42–16
|- style="background:#fcc;"
| 59
| February 16
| Denver
| 
| Stephen Curry (25)
| Kevon Looney (9)
| Stephen Curry (6)
| Chase Center18,064
| 42–17
|- style="background:#cfc;"
| 60
| February 24
| @ Portland
| 
| Curry, Thompson (18)
| Jonathan Kuminga (8)
| Stephen Curry (14)
| Moda Center20,098
| 43–17
|- style="background:#fcc;"
| 61
| February 27
| Dallas
| 
| Stephen Curry (27)
| Kevon Looney (10)
| Stephen Curry (10)
| Chase Center18,064
| 43–18

|- style="background:#fcc;"
| 62
| March 1
| @ Minnesota
| 
| Stephen Curry (34)
| Looney, Wiggins (7)
| Kevon Looney (5)
| Target Center17,136
| 43–19
|- style="background:#fcc;"
| 63
| March 3
| @ Dallas
| 
| Jordan Poole (23)
| Kevon Looney (9)
| Stephen Curry (9)
| American Airlines Center20,229
| 43–20
|- style="background:#fcc;"
| 64
| March 5
| @ L.A. Lakers
| 
| Stephen Curry (30)
| Otto Porter (10)
| Poole, Toscano-Anderson (5)
| Crypto.com Arena18,997
| 43–21
|- style="background:#fcc;"
| 65
| March 7
| @ Denver
| 
| Jordan Poole (32)
| Kevon Looney (11)
| Chris Chiozza (8)
| Ball Arena19,542
| 43–22
|- style="background:#cfc;"
| 66
| March 8
| L.A. Clippers
| 
| Jonathan Kuminga (21)
| Andrew Wiggins (11)
| Kuminga, Looney (6)
| Chase Center18,064
| 44–22
|- style="background:#cfc;"
| 67
| March 10
| @ Denver
| 
| Stephen Curry (34)
| Stephen Curry (9)
| Jordan Poole (7)
| Ball Arena19,520
| 45–22
|- style="background:#cfc;"
| 68
| March 12
| Milwaukee
| 
| Klay Thompson (38)
| Jonathan Kuminga (11)
| Stephen Curry (8)
| Chase Center18,064
| 46–22
|- style="background:#cfc;"
| 69
| March 14
| Washington
| 
| Stephen Curry (47)
| Jonathan Kuminga (8)
| Curry, Green (6)
| Chase Center18,064
| 47–22
|- style="background:#fcc;"
| 70
| March 16
| Boston
| 
| Jordan Poole (29)
| Green, Looney (8)
| Kevon Looney (4)
| Chase Center18,064
| 47–23
|- style="background:#fcc;"
| 71
| March 20
| San Antonio
| 
| Jordan Poole (28)
| Otto Porter (16)
| Nemanja Bjelica (6)
| Chase Center18,064
| 47–24
|- style="background:#fcc;"
| 72
| March 22
| @ Orlando
| 
| Jordan Poole (26)
| Otto Porter (15)
| Draymond Green (7)
| Amway Center17,164
| 47–25
|- style="background:#cfc;"
| 73
| March 23
| @ Miami
| 
| Jordan Poole (30)
| Kevon Looney (16)
| Jordan Poole (9)
| FTX Arena19,600
| 48–25
|- style="background:#fcc;"
| 74
| March 25
| @ Atlanta
| 
| Klay Thompson (37)
| Kevon Looney (8)
| Jordan Poole (10)
| State Farm Arena17,724
| 48–26
|- style="background:#fcc;"
| 75
| March 27
| @ Washington
| 
| Jordan Poole (26)
| Otto Porter (11)
| Draymond Green (6)
| Capital One Arena24,760
| 48–27
|- style="background:#fcc;"
| 76
| March 28
| @ Memphis
| 
| Jordan Poole (25)
| Jonathan Kuminga (7)
| Jonathan Kuminga (4)
| FedExForum17,011
| 48–28
|- style="background:#fcc;"
| 77
| March 30
| Phoenix
| 
| Jordan Poole (38)
| Draymond Green (10)
| Green, Poole (7)
| Chase Center18,064
| 48–29

|- style="background:#cfc;"
| 78
| April 2
| Utah
| 
| Klay Thompson (36)
| Draymond Green (9)
| Draymond Green (7)
| Chase Center18,064
| 49–29
|- style="background:#cfc;"
| 79
| April 3
| @ Sacramento
| 
| Andrew Wiggins (25)
| Nemanja Bjelica (12)
| Nemanja Bjelica (6)
| Golden 1 Center17,583
| 50–29
|- style="background:#cfc;"
| 80
| April 7
| L.A. Lakers
| 
| Klay Thompson (33)
| Otto Porter Jr. (8)
| Jordan Poole (11)
| Chase Center18,064
| 51–29
|- style="background:#cfc;"
| 81
| April 9
| @ San Antonio
| 
| Poole, Kuminga (18)
| Draymond Green (13)
| Green, Poole (8)
| AT&T Center18,627
| 52–29
|- style="background:#cfc;"
| 82
| April 10
| @ New Orleans
| 
| Klay Thompson (41)
| Nemanja Bjelica (7)
| Nemanja Bjelica (7)
| Smoothie King Center16,595
| 53–29

Playoffs

|- style="background:#cfc;"
| 1
| April 16
| Denver
| 
| Jordan Poole (30)
| Andrew Wiggins (9)
| Draymond Green (9)
| Chase Center18,064
| 1–0
|- style="background:#cfc;"
| 2
| April 18
| Denver 
| 
| Stephen Curry (34)
| Andrew Wiggins (8)
| Jordan Poole (8)
| Chase Center18,064
| 2–0
|- style="background:#cfc;"
| 3
| April 21
| @ Denver 
| 
| Poole, Curry (27)
| Andrew Wiggins (6)
| Draymond Green (10)
| Ball Arena19,627
| 3–0
|- style="background:#fcc;"
| 4
| April 24
| @ Denver 
| 
| Stephen Curry (33)
| Draymond Green (11)
| Jordan Poole (9)
| Ball Arena19,628
| 3–1
|- style="background:#cfc;"
| 5
| April 27
| Denver 
| 
| Stephen Curry (30)
| Klay Thompson (9)
| Draymond Green (6)
| Chase Center18,064
| 4–1

|- style="background:#cfc;"
| 1
| May 1
| @ Memphis
| 
| Jordan Poole (31)
| Poole, Wiggins, Porter (8)
| Jordan Poole (9)
| FedExForum17,794
| 1–0
|- style="background:#fcc;"
| 2
| May 3
| @ Memphis
| 
| Stephen Curry (27)
| Draymond Green (10)
| Stephen Curry (8)
| FedExForum17,794
| 1–1
|- style="background:#cfc;"
| 3
| May 7
| Memphis
| 
|Stephen Curry (30)
|Klay Thompson (9)
|Draymond Green (8)
| Chase Center18,064
| 2–1
|- style="background:#cfc;"
| 4
| May 9
| Memphis
| 
|Stephen Curry (32)
|Draymond Green (11)
|Stephen Curry (8)
| Chase Center18,064
| 3–1
|- style="background:#fcc;"
| 5
| May 11
| @ Memphis
| 
|Klay Thompson (19)
|Draymond Green (7)
|Draymond Green (5)
| FedExForum17,794
| 3–2
|- style="background:#cfc;"
| 6
| May 13
| Memphis
|
| Klay Thompson (30)
| Kevon Looney (22)
| Draymond Green (8)
| Chase Center18,064
| 4–2

|-style="background:#cfc;"
| 1
| May 18
| Dallas
| 
| Stephen Curry (21)
| Stephen Curry (12)
| Stephen Curry (4)
| Chase Center18,064
| 1–0
|-style="background:#cfc;"
| 2
| May 20
| Dallas
| 
| Stephen Curry (32)
| Kevon Looney (12)
| 5 players each
| Chase Center18,064
| 2–0
|-style="background:#cfc;"
| 3
| May 22
| @ Dallas
| 
| Stephen Curry (31)
| Kevon Looney (12)
| Stephen Curry (11)
| American Airlines Center20,813
| 3–0
|-style="background:#fcc;"
| 4
| May 24
| @ Dallas
| 
| Stephen Curry (20)
| Jonathan Kuminga (8)
| Stephen Curry (8)
| American Airlines Center20,810
| 3–1
|-style="background:#cfc;"
| 5
| May 26
| Dallas
| 
| Klay Thompson (32)
| Kevon Looney (18)
| Draymond Green (9)
| Chase Center18,064
| 4–1 

|-style="background:#fcc;"
| 1
| June 2
| Boston
| 
| Stephen Curry (34)
| Draymond Green (11)
| Stephen Curry (5)
| Chase Center18,064
| 0–1
|-style="background:#cfc;"
| 2
| June 5
| Boston
| 
| Stephen Curry (29)
| Kevon Looney (7)
| Draymond Green (7)
| Chase Center18,064
| 1–1
|-style="background:#fcc;"
| 3
| June 8
| @ Boston
| 
| Stephen Curry (31)
| Looney, Wiggins (7)
| Otto Porter Jr. (4)
| TD Garden19,156
| 1–2
|-style="background:#cfc;"
| 4
| June 10
| @ Boston
| 
| Stephen Curry (43)
| Andrew Wiggins (16)
| Draymond Green (8)
| TD Garden19,156
| 2–2
|-style="background:#cfc;"
| 5
| June 13
| Boston
| 
| Andrew Wiggins (26)
| Andrew Wiggins (13)
| Stephen Curry (8)
| Chase Center18,064
| 3–2
|-style="background:#cfc;"
| 6
| June 16
| @ Boston
| 
| Stephen Curry (34)
| Draymond Green (12)
| Draymond Green (8)
| TD Garden19,156
| 42

Player Statistics

Regular season

|
| 71 || 0 || 16.1 || .468 || .362 || .728 || 4.1 || 2.2 || .6 || .4 || 6.1
|-
|
| 33 || 1 || 10.7 || .293 || .327 ||1.000|| 1.0 || 1.9 || .4 || .0 || 1.8
|-
|
| 64 || 64 ||34.5|| .437 || .380 || .923 || 5.2 || 6.3 || 1.3 || .4 ||25.5
|-
| ‡
| 4 || 0 || 7.0 || .500 || .000 || – || 1.8 || .8 || .0 || .3 || 1.5
|-
|
| 46 || 44 || 28.9 || .525 || .296 || .659 || 7.3 ||7.0|| 1.3 ||1.1|| 7.5
|-
|
| 31 || 0 || 19.5 || .380 || .230 || .750 || 3.2 || 3.7 || .9 || .7 || 4.0
|-
|
| 70 || 12 || 16.9 || .513 || .336 || .684 || 3.3 || .9 || .4 || .3 || 9.3
|-
|
| 58 || 4 || 20.0 || .441 || .344 || .868 || 3.2 || 1.0 || .7 || .1 || 7.5
|-
|
|82||80|| 21.1 || .571 || .000 || .600 ||7.3|| 2.0 || .6 || .6 || 6.0
|-
|
| 52 || 11 || 11.7 || .437 || .364 || .778 || 1.5 || .4 || .1 || .2 || 4.4
|-
|
| 71 || 16 || 17.6 ||.616|| .358 || .603 || 3.5 || .9 ||1.4|| .3 || 7.1
|-
|
| 76 || 51 || 30.0 || .448 || .364 || .925 || 3.4 || 4.0 || .8 || .3 || 18.5
|-
|
| 63 || 15 || 22.2 || .464 || .370 || .803 || 5.7 || 1.5 || 1.1 || .5 || 8.2
|-
|
| 32 || 32 || 29.4 || .429 || .385 || .902 || 3.9 || 2.8 || .5 || .5 || 20.4
|-
|
| 73 || 6 || 13.6 || .489 || .322 || .571 || 2.4 || 1.7 || .7 || .2 || 4.1
|-
| ≠
| 9 || 0 || 7.6 || .600 || .250 ||1.000|| 1.6 || .4 || .1 || .1 || 3.3
|-
|
| 73 || 73 || 31.9 || .466 ||.393|| .634 || 4.5 || 2.2 || 1.0 || .7 || 17.2
|}
Through March 28, 2022.
‡ Waived during the season
† Traded during the season
≠ Acquired during the season

Transactions

Overview

Trades

Free agency

Re-signed

Additions

Subtractions

Awards

References

Golden State Warriors seasons
Golden State
Western Conference (NBA) championship seasons
NBA championship seasons
2021 in San Francisco
2022 in San Francisco
Golden State Warriors
Golden State Warriors